Szolnok Air Base  is a military air base located near Szolnok, a city in Jász-Nagykun-Szolnok county, Hungary.

Facilities

Accidents and incidents
On 24 April 1968, Lisunov Li-2 HA-LIO of Magyar Honvédelmi Szövetség was destroyed by fire in a refuelling accident.

References

External links
 
 

Buildings and structures in Szolnok
Military airbases of Hungary